Tamás Katona (2 February 1932 – 28 June 2013) was a Hungarian historian, academic, politician, who served as Secretary of State for Foreign Affairs from 1990 to 1992 and as Mayor of Budavár (1st district of Budapest) between 1994 and 1998. Besides that he represented Vác (Pest County Constituency II) in the National Assembly of Hungary from 1990 to 1994, and functioned as MP from the Hungarian Democratic Forum's Pest County Regional List between 1994 and 1998.

Katona served as president of the Hungarian Scout Association between 1994 and 1998. He was the Hungarian Ambassador to Poland from 2000 to 2002.

Selected publications
Az aradi vértanúk (Budapest, 1979)
A korona kilenc évszázada. Történelmi források a magyar koronáról (editor; Budapest, 1979)
A tatárjárás emlékezete (editor; Budapest, 1981)
Budavár bevételének emlékezete, 1849 (editor; Budapest, 1989)
Kossuth Lajos: Írások és beszédek 1848–1849-ből (editor; Budapest, 1994)

References

1932 births
2013 deaths
20th-century Hungarian historians
Hungarian diplomats
Hungarian translators
Hungarian academics
Hungarian librarians
Hungarian Democratic Forum politicians
Members of the National Assembly of Hungary (1990–1994)
Members of the National Assembly of Hungary (1994–1998)
Mayors of places in Hungary
Ambassadors of Hungary to Poland
Scouting and Guiding in Hungary
Writers from Budapest
20th-century translators